Marie-Renée Oget (born 26 January 1945) is a French politician. 

Elected to the National Assembly on 16 June 2002 for the 12th legislature (2002—2007), then re-elected on 17 June 2007 for the 13th legislature (2007—2012), Oget represented Côtes-d'Armor's 4th constituency. She was part of the Socialist, Radical and Citizen parliamentary group and a member of the cultural, familial and social affairs commission in the National Assembly.

Summary of mandates 

 National Assembly
 19 June 2002 — 19 June 2007: Deputy for Côtes-d'Armor's 4th constituency.
 20 June 2007 — 19 June 2012: Deputy for Côtes-d'Armor's 4th constituency.
 Regional Council of Brittany
 1 January 1997 — 15 March 1998: Regional councillor of Brittany. 
 16 March 1998 — 31 August 2002: Regional councillor of Brittany. 
 Mayor of Treffrin
 18 March 2001 — 30 March 2014: Mayor of Treffrin, Côtes-d'Armor.
 Communauté de communes du Kreiz-Breizh
 1998 — 2006: 1st Vice-president of the Communauté de communes du Kreiz-Breizh.

References

1945 births
Living people
People from Côtes-d'Armor
Socialist Party (France) politicians
Women mayors of places in France
20th-century French women politicians
Women members of the National Assembly (France)
Deputies of the 12th National Assembly of the French Fifth Republic
Deputies of the 13th National Assembly of the French Fifth Republic
21st-century French women politicians